Aspartylglucosamine is a derivative of aspartic acid.

Levels are elevated in aspartylglucosaminuria.

References
 

Amino acid derivatives
Hexosamines
Acetamides